Irina Yuryevna Bliznova (born 6 October 1986) is a Russian handball player, who plays for Lada Togliatti. She won the gold medal at the 2005 and 2007 world championships and 2016 Rio Olympics, placing second in 2008 and eighth in 2012. She announced her retirement shortly after the 2016 Olympics.

Bliznova is married to Alexander and has a daughter Arina (born 2010) and a son Arkhip (born 2014).

References

External links

1986 births
Living people
Sportspeople from Krasnodar
Russian female handball players
Olympic handball players of Russia
Olympic medalists in handball
Olympic silver medalists for Russia
Olympic gold medalists for Russia
Medalists at the 2008 Summer Olympics
Medalists at the 2016 Summer Olympics
Handball players at the 2008 Summer Olympics
Handball players at the 2012 Summer Olympics
Handball players at the 2016 Summer Olympics